Imma euglypta is a moth in the family Immidae. It was described by Edward Meyrick in 1931. It is found in Colombia.

References

Moths described in 1931
Immidae
Moths of South America